In electrical power engineering, power systems CAD is  computer-aided design (CAD) software  that is used to design and simulate electrical power systems in commercial and industrial buildings.

Electrical power systems CAD tools are used by electrical power systems engineers. In the United States alone, power systems are a $100 billion industry. Power systems CAD tools increase the productivity, efficiency, and effectiveness of electrical systems designers  by providing a design foundation that allows power systems to be created quickly and by enabling design engineers to test the safety and integrity of their design concepts. Power systems CAD software products allow organizations to develop power systems designs, with faster turnaround time, than with previous manual methods.

Aids to electrical calculation started with DC network calculating boards and AC network analyzers, which reached a high degree of development by the middle of the 20th century. Large scale digital computers became powerful enough to overtake the previous analog model systems.  The use of personal computers with graphical displays lead to development of integrated suites of power systems design software, which allowed several different power system studies to be carried out on the same input model data.

CAD overview

The electrical power systems CAD process, frequently called power systems "modeling," typically consists of two distinct stages:

 The design stage, in which an electric systems model is created, and
 The simulation or analysis stage, in which software simulation programs are used to test the integrity of the design; these simulation programs test how the model would behave in real-world operation by checking for specific types of design or operational problems (see list below.)

Design is an iterative process, in which simulation results will suggest ways that the design should be modified to increase safety, reliability, and serviceability.  At the conclusion of the design effort, organizations will enjoy a far higher degree of confidence in the integrity of their power systems infrastructure than with manually drawn schematics.

The same model used for computer-aided design of a power system can be used as the basis for real-time monitoring and modeling of the system, giving network operators a quantitative value for any proposed changes in system operating conditions.

Calculations and simulations 

Several electrical engineering calculations and tests can be performed on a power systems CAD model, including:  
 Short circuit analysis 
 AC and DC Arc flash  
 Protective device coordination 
 Power flow study 
 Cable pulling  
 Power system reliability  
 Electromagnetic transient analysis
 cable ampacity  
 Induction motor parameter estimation  
 Transmission line parameters 
 Power system optimization 
 Electrical substation grounding grid design  
 Motor starting 
 Voltage stability and contingency analysis.

References and Sources

Computer-aided design software